Ida-Dehmel-Literaturpreis is a literary prize in Germany.  Awarded every three years, it was created by the Societies of female artists and their supporters ("Gemeinschaften der Künstlerinnen und Kunstförderer e. V." / GEDOK) to honour Ida Dehmel.

Winners 

1968: Hilde Domin
1971: Erika Burkart
1975: Margot Scharpenberg
1977: Rose Ausländer
1980: Ingeborg Drewitz
1983: Barbara Frischmuth
1986: Eva Zeller
1989: Brigitte Kronauer
1992: Sarah Kirsch
1995: Elke Erb
1998: Herta Müller
2001: Helga M. Novak
2004: Kerstin Hensel
2007: Doris Runge
2010: Ulla Hahn
2014: Karla Schneider
2017: Monika Maron
2020: Ulrike Draesner

External links
 

German literary awards